Another River is a river located within Lake Clark National Park and Preserve in the Kenai Peninsula Borough, Alaska, in the United States.

"Another River" was so named in 1927 by geologists who had already named many other rivers.

See also
 List of rivers of Alaska

References

Rivers of Kenai Peninsula Borough, Alaska
Rivers of Alaska
Lake Clark National Park and Preserve